

The Kubicek AV-1 is a hot-air airship designed and built in the Czech Republic by Kubicek Limited. The AV-1 was built as an advertising airship for the TICO group of Prague and first flew on the 16 October 1993.

Specification

References

Notes

Bibliography

Airships
Balloons (aeronautics)
Individual balloons (aircraft)
Airships of the Czech Republic